The Columbus Confederate Yankees were a Minor League Baseball team that played in the Double-A Southern League from 1964 to 1966. They were located in Columbus, Georgia, and played their home games at Golden Park. Their seemingly contradictory nickname came from Georgia's former membership in the Confederacy and for their Major League Baseball affiliate, the New York Yankees, as it was common for Yankees affiliates to share the big league club's moniker.

Over three seasons of competition, Columbus played in 415 regular season games and compiled a win–loss record of 206–209. They won the Southern League championship in 1965.

History
The Columbus Confederate Yankees were charter members of the Southern League, which began play in 1964. As the Double-A affiliate of the New York Yankees, they were managed by former major league catcher Rube Walker. The team finished its first year of play with a 64–74 record in seventh place.

The 1965 club was managed by Loren Babe, an ex-Yankee third baseman. On July 19, the Confederate Yankees hosted the 1965 Southern League All-Star Game. With 4,091 people in attendance at Golden Park, they defeated a team of the league's All-Stars, 4–3. Two members of the Columbus pitching staff threw no-hitters that season. The first occurred on June 30  when Mike Jurewicz no-hit the Charlotte Hornets in the second game of a seven-inning doubleheader. The second happened on August 13 when Rich Beck pitched seven no-hit innings against the Lynchburg White Sox. The 1965 SL pennant race was a close one: going into the final weekend, the Asheville Tourists led Columbus by a single game, with a three-game series set for Golden Park to determine the title. After splitting the first two games, Columbus won the finale, 7–0, with Rich Beck tossing a two-hit shutout, handing Columbus the Southern League pennant with a 79–59 first-place finish; technically, the Yankees were in a virtual first-place tie with Asheville, but the Tourists (80–60) played two more games, and thus had a lower winning percentage. The pennant-winning season meant that the Confederate Yankees were the league champions, as there was no postseason in the Southern League at that time.

In 1966, their final season of play, the Confederate Yankees were managed by Jack Reed, an outfielder with the 1961 World Series champion Yankees. They ended the season in seventh place at 63–76. During the off-season, the Southern League contracted from eight teams to six and Columbus left the circuit; they would return in 1969 as a White Sox affiliate.

Season-by-season results

Players 

Twenty-three Confederate Yankees also played in at least one game for a Major League Baseball (MLB) team during their careers. These players and their years with Columbus were:

Stan Bahnsen (1965)
Rich Barry (1964–1965)
Rich Beck (1965)
Bill Bethea (1965)
Gil Blanco (1966)
Jim Brenneman (1966)
Tom Dukes (1964)
Frank Fernández (1964–1965)
Mike Ferraro (1965)
Mike Hegan (1964–1965)
Bill Henry (1966)
Elvio Jiménez (1966)
Mike Jurewicz (1965–1966)
Jerry Kenney (1966)
Dave McDonald (1966)
John Miller (1965–1966)
Cecil Perkins (1965–1966)
Fritz Peterson (1965)
Roger Repoz (1964)
Ellie Rodríguez (1966)
Steve Whitaker (1965–1966)
Roy White (1964–1965)
Dooley Womack (1964)

References

External links
Statistics from Baseball-Reference

1964 establishments in Georgia (U.S. state)
1966 disestablishments in Georgia (U.S. state)
Baseball teams established in 1964
Baseball teams disestablished in 1966
Defunct Southern League (1964–present) teams
New York Yankees minor league affiliates
Sports in Columbus, Georgia
Defunct baseball teams in Georgia